Tristan Lahaye (born 16 February 1983 in Juvisy-sur-Orge, Essonne) is a French footballer who last played as a defender for Ligue 2 side Chamois Niortais.

Lahaye has played for AS Beauvais Oise, FC Sète, Amiens SC and LB Châteauroux in Ligue 2. He also had a spell in the Belgian Pro League with Kortrijk between 2008 and 2009.

Career statistics

External links

Tristan Lahaye profile at foot-national.com

1983 births
Living people
People from Juvisy-sur-Orge
French footballers
Belgian Pro League players
K.V. Kortrijk players
AS Beauvais Oise players
FC Sète 34 players
Amiens SC players
LB Châteauroux players
SO Romorantin players
Grenoble Foot 38 players
Chamois Niortais F.C. players
Ligue 2 players
Championnat National players
Association football defenders
Footballers from Essonne